The 8th Pan American Junior Athletics Championships were held in Santiago, Chile, on September 1–3, 1995.

Participation (unofficial)

Detailed result lists can be found on the "World Junior Athletics History" website.  An unofficial count yields the number of about 380 athletes from about 20 countries: Argentina (32), Bahamas (5), Bolivia (2), Brazil (60), British Virgin Islands (1), Canada (28), Chile (50), Colombia (17), Costa Rica (2), Cuba (15), Dominican Republic (1), Ecuador (12), Jamaica (21), Mexico (33), Peru (4), Puerto Rico (9), Saint Kitts and Nevis (2), United States (66), Uruguay (14), Venezuela (6).

Medal summary
Medal winners are published.
Complete results can be found on the "World Junior Athletics History" website.

Men

Women

Medal table (unofficial)

References

External links
World Junior Athletics History

Pan American U20 Athletics Championships
1995 in Chilean sport
Pan American U20 Championships
International athletics competitions hosted by Chile
1995 in youth sport